Ealing Common is a London Underground station on the Uxbridge branch of the Piccadilly line and on the Ealing Broadway branch of the District line. Eastbound, the next station is Acton Town; westbound, the next station is North Ealing on the Piccadilly line and Ealing Broadway on the District line. Here, the District and Piccadilly lines share the same pair of tracks through the station the only other example where a deep level line and a sub surface line share the same pair of tracks is further up the Uxbridge branch, where the Piccadilly line shares tracks with the Metropolitan line from Rayners Lane to Uxbridge. It is the only station west of Acton Town to be served by both the Piccadilly and District lines.

It is in Travelcard Zone 3.

History 

Ealing Common station was opened on 1 July 1879 by the District Railway (DR, now the District line) on its extension from Turnham Green to Ealing Broadway. From 1886 until 1 March 1910 the station was known as Ealing Common and West Acton after which it changed to its current name.

On 23 June 1903, the DR opened an extension of the tracks from north of Ealing Common. The extension initially reached as far as Park Royal & Twyford Abbey (closed and replaced by Park Royal in 1931), where the Royal Agricultural Society's Park Royal show grounds had been recently opened, before being opened to South Harrow on 28 June 1903.

This new extension was, together with the existing tracks between Ealing Common and Acton Town, the first section of the Underground's surface lines to be electrified and operate electric instead of steam trains. The deep level tube lines open at that time (City and South London Railway, Waterloo and City Railway, and Central London Railway) had been electrically powered from the start. Electric trains started running on the section of line between Ealing Common and Ealing Broadway on 1 July 1905.

During 1930 and 1931, a new station building was constructed to replace the 1879 building. The new building, by Charles Holden in a style reminiscent of his designs for the 1926 Morden extension of the City and South London Railway (now part of the Northern line), was constructed in Portland stone and features a tall heptagonal ticket hall with glazed screens to all sides. The new building opened on 1 March 1931 and is very similar to the reconstructed station at Hounslow West built at the same time, also by Heaps and Holden.

On 4 July 1932, the Piccadilly line was extended to run west of its original terminus at Hammersmith, sharing the route with the District line to Ealing Common. From Ealing Common to South Harrow, the District line was replaced by the Piccadilly line and, from this date, District line trains west from Ealing Common run to Ealing Broadway only.

The station today 
There is a shop/kiosk available at times in the station booking hall area. Many trains leaving Ealing Common Depot enter service here. This is usually in the early morning, and in the westbound direction (towards Ealing Broadway Station).

Although it is possible for trains to enter the depot directly from platform one (the westbound platform), this rarely happens except for a few empty trains after the station is closed at night. However, at times of disruption it is possible for trains to arrive on platform one and, empty of passengers, then it would have to shunt forward in order to reverse and enter the depot. The train would then stable, or reverse into platform two in order to re-enter service and continue eastbound.

To the east of platform two, there are two siding roads. Those stop approximately halfway along the adjacent main-line road. They are separated from the platforms by a cement wall (behind which viewing is possible) and a wooden locked door from the platform. These roads are not connected directly to the main line, but to Ealing Common Depot and are used for shunting and reversing trains within the depot.

Services

District Line

The peak time service is:
8tph to Upminster (Eastbound) 
8tph to Ealing Broadway (Westbound)

The off-peak service is:
6tph to Upminster (Eastbound)
6tph to Ealing Broadway (Westbound)

Piccadilly Line

The peak time service is:
12tph to Cockfosters (Eastbound)
6tph to Rayners Lane (Westbound)
6tph to Uxbridge via Rayners Lane (Westbound)

The off-peak service is:
6tph to Cockfosters (Eastbound)
3tph to Rayners Lane (Westbound)
3tph to Uxbridge via Rayners Lane (Westbound)

Connections
London Buses routes 207, 607 and night routes N7 and N207 serve the station.

Gallery

References

External links 

 
 
 
 
 
 
 
 
 
 

District line stations
Piccadilly line stations
Tube stations in the London Borough of Ealing
Former Metropolitan District Railway stations
Railway stations in Great Britain opened in 1879
Charles Holden railway stations
Art Deco architecture in London
Grade II listed buildings in the London Borough of Ealing